Ashtijeh (also Romanized as Ashtījeh; also known as Ashnījeh, Ashtejeh, and Eshījeh) is a village in Narestan Rural District, Aqda District, Ardakan County, Yazd Province, Iran. At the 2006 census, its population was 64, in 28 families.

References 

Populated places in Ardakan County